Sanhe is a township of Taobei District, Baicheng, Jilin, China, located in the western suburbs about  from the southern border of Inner Mongolia. , it has 9 villages under its administration.

See also 
 List of township-level divisions of Jilin

References 

Township-level divisions of Jilin
Baicheng